Zoe Rahman Trio: Live (also known as Live with special guest Idris Rahman) is the fourth studio album by English jazz composer Zoe Rahman, released on 11 May 2009 by Manushi Records.

Background
Live was recorded at London's PizzaExpress Jazz Club in April 2007, a month before the sessions for the album Where Rivers Meet. The album includes two tracks subsequently recorded for Where Rivers Meet.

Critical response

John Fordham of The Guardian rated Live 4/5 and said, "...The folksier episodes echo Gilad Atzmon's brand of eastern-influenced world music, and the eager confidence and fluency of the way Rahman's solos break out of the themes confirm her ascent to an impressive new level."

Chris May of All About Jazz rated the album 4/5 and said, "Hard swinging and outgoing, Live is an infectious goodtime album and provides a valuable record of where the Zoe Rahman Trio was at in early 2007..." The Scotsman rated it 3/5 and said of the album, "Sound is good if a little recessed in places, but the energy and imagination carry the day."

Track listing

Personnel
Musicians
Zoe Rahman – piano
Gene Calderazzo – drums
Oli Hayhurst – bass
Idris Rahman – clarinet

References

External links

2009 live albums
Instrumental albums
Zoe Rahman live albums
Albums recorded at the PizzaExpress Jazz Club